Thomas Martin Crowley (15 November 1901 – 18 October 1965) was a member of the Queensland Legislative Assembly.

Biography
Crowley was born at Innisfail, Queensland, the son of James Crowley and his wife Margaret (née Fitzgerald). He was educated at the Good Samaritan Convent in Innisfail and after leaving school was a wholesaler of wines, spirits and groceries in Cairns and a sugar cane and tobacco farmer at Mossman.

On 30 June 1926 he married Kathleen Agnes Pease (died 1952) and together had two sons and four daughters. He died in Sydney in October 1965 and was buried in the Macquarie Park Cemetery.

Public career
Crowley was an alderman on the Cairns City Council from 1938 to 1947 and then beat the sitting member for Cairns, Lou Barnes, at the 1947 state election. He held the seat for nine years, retiring in 1956.

References

Members of the Queensland Legislative Assembly
1901 births
1965 deaths
Australian Labor Party members of the Parliament of Queensland
20th-century Australian politicians